Wushu, or Kung fu, is a hard and soft and complete martial art, as well as a full-contact combat sport. It has a long history in reference to Chinese martial arts. It was developed in 1949 in an effort to standardize the practice of traditional Chinese martial arts, yet attempts to structure the various decentralized martial arts traditions date back earlier, when the Central Guoshu Institute was established at Nanking in 1928.

"Wushu" is the Chinese term for "martial arts" (武 "Wu" = combat or martial, 術 "Shu" = art). In contemporary times, Wushu has become an international sport under the International Wushu Federation (IWUF), which holds the World Wushu Championships every two years. Wushu is an official event at the Asian Games, East Asian Youth Games, Southeast Asian Games, World Combat Games, and in various other multi-sport events.

Name
The word wu (武; wǔ) means ‘martial’. Its Chinese character is made of two parts; the first meaning “walk” or “stop” (止; zhǐ) and the second meaning “lance” (戈; gē). This implies that “wu’ 武,” is a defensive use of combat.[dubious – discuss] The term “wushu 武術” meaning 'martial arts' goes back as far as the Liang Dynasty (502–557) in an anthology compiled by Xiao Tong (蕭通), (Prince Zhaoming; 昭明太子 d. 531), called Selected Literature (文選; Wénxuǎn). The term is found in the second verse of a poem by Yan Yanzhi titled: 皇太子釋奠會作詩 "Huang Taizi Shidian Hui Zuoshi".

The term wushu is also found in a poem by Cheng Shao (1626–1644) from the Ming Dynasty.

The earliest term for 'martial arts' can be found in the Han History (206BC-23AD) was "military fighting techniques" (兵技巧; bīng jìqiǎo). During the Song period (circa 960) the name changed to "martial arts" (武藝; wǔyì). In 1928 the name was changed to "national arts" (國術; guóshù) when the National Martial Arts Academy was established in Nanjing. The term reverted to wǔshù under the People's Republic of China during the early 1950s.

History
In 1958, the government established the organization to  martial arts training.  The Chinese State Commission for Physical Culture and Sports led the creation of standardized forms for most of the major arts. During this period, a national Wushu system that included standard forms, teaching curriculum, and instructor grading was established. Wushu was introduced at both the high school and university level. This new system seeks to incorporate common elements from all styles and forms as well as the general ideas associated with Chinese martial arts. Stylistic concepts such as hard, soft, internal, external, as well as classifications based on schools such as Shaolin, Tai chi, Wudang, and others were all integrated into one system.  Wushu became the government sponsored standard for the training in martial arts in China. The push for standardization continued leading to widespread adaptation.  

In 1979, the State Commission for Physical Culture and Sports created a special task force to teaching and practice of Wushu. In 1986, the Chinese National Research Institute of Wushu was established as the central authority for the research and administration of Wushu activities in China. Changing government policies and attitudes towards sports in general led to the closing of the State Sports Commission (the central sports authority) in 1998. This closure is viewed as an attempt to partially de-politicize organized sports and move Chinese sport policies towards a more market-driven approach. As a result of these changing sociological factors within China, both traditional styles and modern Wushu approaches are being promoted by the International Wushu Federation.

Taolu 

Wushu events are performed using compulsory or individual routines or taolu in competition. Throughout the 1990s until 2005 for international competitions, athletes competed with routines that were choreographed by IWUF assigned coaches or athletes. In November 2003, a major revision in the taolu competition rules occurred: deduction content was standardized, judges roles were organized and expanded, and the degree of difficulty component, also known as nandu (難度; difficulty movements), was added. This category is worth 2 points of the 10 total. The quality of movements category is worth 5 points, and the overall performance category is worth 3 points. These changes were first implemented at the 2005 World Wushu Championships, and individual routines have become standard where an athlete creates a routine with the aid of his/her coach, while following certain rules for difficulty and technical requirements. Only the age group C and B athletes at the World Junior Wushu Championships still compete with compulsory routines at an international level. All junior events including group A athletes (which compete with individual routines), all traditional events, and all non-standard taolu events (ie. shuangdao, baguazhang etc.), are judged without the degree of difficulty component.

In addition to events for individual routines, some wushu competitions also feature dual and group events. The dual event, also called duilian (对练), is an event in which there is some form of sparring with weapons or without weapons. The group event, also known as jiti (集體), requires a group of people to perform together and smooth synchronization of actions is crucial. Usually, the group event also allows instrumental music to accompany the choreography during the performance. The carpet used for the group event is also larger than the one used for individual routines. The 2019 World Wushu Championships was the first international wushu competition to feature such an event.

Barehanded 
 Changquan is an event derived from styles such as Chāquán (查拳), Huaquan (華拳), Hongquan (洪拳), and Shaolinquan (少林拳) as well as other traditional styles. Changquan is the most popular and difficult of all wushu events, which requires great speed, power, accuracy, and flexibility. Most professional athletes in China start training this style starting at a young age.
 Nanquan is an event derived from styles that originated in the southern regions of China such as Hongjiaquan (洪家拳), Cailifoquan (蔡李佛拳), and Yongchunquan (詠春拳). Nanquan typically requires less flexibility and has fewer acrobatics than Changquan, but it also requires greater leg stability and power generation through leg and hip coordination.
 Taijiquan as a wushu taolu event, is largely based on the Yang (楊) style of Taijiquan, but also includes movements of the Chen (陳), Wu (吳), Wu (Hao) (武), and Sun (孫) styles. Competitive contemporary taiji is distinct from the traditional first form for styles it draws from, in that it typically involves difficult balances and jumps which require great balance, control, and flexibility. The taijiquan event as well as other taiji-based events are usually performed with musical accompaniment.

Short weapons

 Daoshu is an event which uses the dao using changquan methods of movement.
 Jianshu is an event that uses the jian using changquan methods of movement.
 Nandao was introduced into international wushu competition in 1999.  The weapon and techniques are based on the butterfly swords of Yongchunquan, a southern style. The blade has been lengthened and modified so that a singular sword is used.
 Taijijian is an event that uses the jian based on traditional Taijiquan jian methods. This event was added into international competition in 1999.
 Taijishan is an event which uses a Chinese Hand fan with traditional Taijiquan methods. This event was created in 2019 ahead of wushu's participation in the 2026 Summer Youth Olympics (originally scheduled for 2022), and so it has yet to debut in competition.

Long weapons
 Gunshu is an event which uses a staff with changquan methods of movement. Staffs were traditionally made from white wax wood, but carbon fiber staff have become the standard in international competition since the 2010s since they are lighter and more durable.
 Qiangshu is an event which uses a spear using changquan methods of movement. The shaft of the spear is generally more flexible and longer than what is used in the gunshu event.
 Nangun was introduced into international wushu competition in 1999. It uses a staff with nanquan methods of movement. The staff is generally much thicker and heavier than the one used in the gunshu event.

The majority of routines used in the sport are new, modernized recompilations of traditional routines. However, routines taken directly from traditional styles, including the styles that are not part of standard events, may be performed in competition, especially in China. Many of these styles though are events in the World Kung Fu Championships, another IWUF-run event which is exclusively for traditional styles of wushu. The more commonly seen routines include:

Traditional weapons routines
There is also a traditional weapons category, which often includes the following:

Sanda 

The other major discipline of contemporary Chinese Wushu is 散打 Sǎndǎ, or 运动散打 (Yùndòng Sǎndǎ, Sport Free-Fighting), or 竞争散打 (Jìngzhēng Sàndǎ, Competitive Free-Fighting) meaning: A modern fighting method, sport, and applicable component of Wushu / Kung Fu influenced by traditional Chinese boxing, of which takedowns and throws are legal in competition, as well as all other sorts of striking (use of arms and legs). Chinese wrestling methods called Shuai Jiao and other Chinese grappling techniques such as Chin Na. It has all the combat aspects of wushu.

Sanda appears much like Kickboxing or Muay Thai, but includes many more grappling techniques. Sanda fighting competitions are often held alongside taolu or form competitions. Sanda represents the modern development of Lei Tai contests, but with rules in place to reduce the chance of serious injury. Many Chinese martial art schools teach or work within the rule sets of Sanda, working to incorporate the movements, characteristics, and theory of their style.

Chinese martial artists also compete in non-Chinese or mixed combat sports, including Boxing, Kickboxing and Mixed Martial Arts. Sanda is practised in tournaments and is normally held alongside taolu events in wushu competition. For safety reasons, some techniques from the self-defense form such as elbow strikes, chokes, and joint locks, are not allowed during tournaments. Competitors can win by knockout or points which are earned by landing strikes to the body or head, throwing an opponent, or when competition is held on a raised lei tai platform, pushing them off the platform. Fighters are only allowed to clinch for a few seconds. If the clinch is not broken by the fighters, and if neither succeeds in throwing his opponent within the time limit, the referee will break the clinch. In the U.S., competitions are held either in boxing rings or on the raised lei tai platform. Amateur fighters wear protective gear.

Amateur Sanda allows kicks, punches and throws. King of Sanda, a competition held in China, is held in a ring similar to a boxing ring in design but larger in dimension. As professionals, they wear no protective gear except for gloves, cup, and mouthpiece, and "Professional Sanda" allows knee and elbow strikes (including to the head) as well as kicking, punching and throwing.

Some Sanda fighters have participated in fighting tournaments such as K-1, Muay Thai, boxing and Shoot Boxing. They have had some degree of success, especially in Shoot Boxing competitions, which is more similar to Sanda. Due to the rules of kickboxing competition, Sanda fighters are subjected to more limitations than usual. Also notable competitors in China's mainstream Mixed Martial Arts competitions, Art of War Fighting Championship and Ranik Ultimate Fighting Federation are dominantly of wushu background. Sanda has been featured in many style-versus-style competitions. Muay Thai is frequently pitted against Sanda as is karate, kickboxing, and Tae Kwon Do. Although it is less common, some Sanda practitioners have also fought in the publicly viewed American Mixed Martial Arts competitions.

Competitions

Major international and regional competitions featuring wushu include:
 World Wushu Championships
 World Junior Wushu Championships
 World Games (2009, 2013, 2022)
 World Combat Games
 Asian Games
 East Asian Games
 East Asian Youth Games
 National Games of China
 South Asian Games
 Southeast Asian Games
 Mediterranean Games
 Lusofonia Games

Wushu is not a Summer Olympic sport; the IWUF has repeatedly backed proposals for Wushu to be added to the Olympic programme, most recently as one of eight sports proposed for the 2020 Summer Olympics in Tokyo, Japan. However, it failed to reach the final shortlist, and the International Olympic Committee (IOC) ultimately voted for the re-inclusion of wrestling instead. Wushu was formally introduced into the Olympics as an exhibition sport in Berlin, in 1936, under Chancellor Hitler's request. In March 2015, IWUF executive vice president Anthony Goh stated that the Federation was planning to propose Wushu again for the 2024 Summer Olympics. As part of new IOC rules allowing host committees to accept proposals for new sports to be added to the programme (allowing the addition of sports of local interest to the Olympic programme under an "event-based" model), in June 2015, Wushu was shortlisted again as part of eight sports proposed for inclusion in the 2020 Games in this manner. However, it did not make the final shortlist of five. On 8 January 2020, it was announced by the IOC that Wushu will be added to the 2022 Summer Youth Olympics (which have been rescheduled to 2026).

Owing to its cultural significance in China, the IOC allowed the organizers of the 2008 Summer Olympics in Beijing to hold a Wushu tournament in parallel with the Games as a separate eventthe first time that the IOC has allowed such an event.

Wushu was also a demonstration sport at the 2014 Summer Youth Olympics at Nanjing, which featured events for Group A athletes who qualified at the World Junior Wushu Championships earlier that year. Wushu was also part of the 2014 Nanjing Sports Lab along with skateboarding, roller skating, and sports climbing.

Notable practitioners
 Wu Bin (吳彬/吴彬) – Jet Li's coach in the Beijing Wushu Team, training more wushu champions than any other coach in China.
 Jet Li (李連杰/李连杰) – possibly the most famous wushu practitioner in the world.  He started wushu as a competition sport and gained fame as he took the National Wushu Champion of China title five times as an original member of the Beijing Wushu Team, he was later selected to demonstrate his wushu on the silver screen in the worldwide hit film Shaolin Temple.  Many of his old teammates have also appeared on-screen with him, especially in his older movies.
 Donnie Yen (甄子丹) – Chinese martial artist and actor, trained with the Beijing Wushu Team. Gold medalists for various international Wushu Competitions. Known for his portrayal of Ip Man, mentor of Bruce Lee.
 Wu Jing (吳京/吴京) – Chinese actor who was sent to the Beijing Sports Institute at Shichahai in Beijing when he was 6 years old. Like Jet Li he competed as a member of the Beijing Wushu Team in national level wushu competitions in China. Both his father and grandfather were also martial artists
 Ray Park – Showcased his skills in wushu in several major films, including his portrayal of Darth Maul in 1999's Star Wars: Episode I – The Phantom Menace, as well as Toad in the film X-Men (2000) and as stunt-double for Robin Shou and James Remar in Mortal Kombat: Annihilation. He also heavily retrained prior to filming G.I. Joe: The Rise of Cobra, in which he portrayed the martial arts expert Snake Eyes.
 Steve Coleman – Longest running Great Britain Wushu champion 2002–present, Captain GB Wushu Team, starred as Shane Powers in film On the Ropes.
 Jon Foo – Learned Kung Fu when he was 8 years old, but didn't begin serious training in Wu Shu until he was 15. Starred as Jin Kazama in the film adaptation of Tekken.
 Jade Xu (徐慧慧) is a martial arts actress and multiple World Wushu Champion. She won the World Championships three times in a row and the first (gun/staff) and second (dao/broadsword) place in the Olympic Wushu Tournament Beijing 2008 and became one of the most famous female Wushu athletes in the world. Soon after her athletic career, Jade Xu received offers to star in various international Film and TV productions, such as Tai Chi 0, Tai Chi Hero and Michael Jackson: One, and successfully launched her second career, as an actress.
 Muslim Salikhov: He is one of the most technical fighters in sanshou. He has participated in MMA competitions such as Ultimate Fighting Championship(UFC). Salikhov is from Russia.
 Cung Le: Cung Le is an American Vietnamese and successful wushu sanda and Mixed martial arts fighter. He has won a lot of medals.
 Zhao Changjun: Zhao is one of the most decorated wushu champions ever. Only one other martial artist has challenged his winning record: Jet Li. In wushu circles, it is said that the '70s belonged to Jet, but the '80s belonged to Zhao. Even throughout the 70's, Zhao was always pressuring Jet. From the late '70s to the late '80s, Zhao captured ten individual all-around titles in national and international events. He has earned 54 gold medals and has demonstrated in five continents for over thirty countries. Zhao is undeniably one of the greatest wushu masters of all time. And yet, despite his glorious wushu record, he's a staunch proponent of traditional martial arts. 
 Yuan Wenqing (原文庆) – One of the most famous, successful, and skilled wushu practitioners in the world who has won countless gold medals in Chinese, World, and Asian Championships. He is a former Shanxi wushu team athlete trained by the coaches Pang Lin Tai and Zhang Ling Mei. He is most famous for his ChangQuan, DaoShu, GunShu, ShuangDao, and DiTangQuan. A number of his routines (TaoLu) became the official standard competition routines (GuiDing) for a number of years until the new GuiDing TaoLu's were introduced.

Criticism
Wushu has faced criticism as a competitive sport. It has been criticized by some traditional martial artists for being too commercialized, losing many of its original values, and potentially threatening old styles of teaching. Such critics argue that contemporary wushu helped to create a dichotomy between form work and combat application.

See also

 Kung fu
Chinese martial arts
Eighteen Arms of Wushu
 List of Chinese martial arts
Wuxia
Chinese culture

References

Notes
 Mastering WUSHU, Jiang Bangjun and Emilio Alpanseque, 
 Fundamentals of High Performance Wushu: Taolu Jumps and Spins, Raymond Wu, 
 Kung Fu Elements , Liang, Shou-Yu and Wu, Wen-Ching,

External links

 Wushu.in – Martial arts community online
 International Wushu Federation – Official website

 
Chinese martial arts terminology
Chinese martial arts
Combat sports
Sports originating in China

my:ဝူရှူ